AverStar (formerly Intermetrics, Inc.) was a software company founded in Cambridge, Massachusetts in 1969 by several veterans of M.I.T.'s Instrumentation Laboratory who had worked on the software for NASA's Apollo Program including the Apollo Guidance Computer.

The company specialized in compiler technology.  It was responsible for the design and implementation of the HAL/S programming language, used to write the Space Shuttle PASS (Primary Avionics Software System). It participated in the design effort leading to the Ada programming language, designed the Red language, one of the finalists in the design competition, and wrote one of the first production-quality Ada compilers. The large-scale Ada 95 revision of the language was designed at Intermetrics.

Intermetrics merged with Whitesmiths Ltd. in December 1988. In 1997, Intermetrics merged with computer game developer Looking Glass Studios . In 1998, Intermetrics acquired Pacer Infotec, and changed its name to 'AverStar'. AverStar merged with the Titan Corporation in March, 2000; Titan was acquired by L-3 Communications in 2005.

References

External links

A history of Intermetrics, some subjective notes on Intermetrics in the 1970s and 1980s
 Fourth conference — Intermetrics part of the Apollo Guidance Computer History Project

Defunct software companies of the United States
Ada (programming language)
Software companies based in Massachusetts
Defunct companies based in Massachusetts
Companies based in Cambridge, Massachusetts
Software companies established in 1969
Technology companies disestablished in 1998